The Pakistan football champions are the winners of the highest league in Pakistani football, which is currently the Pakistan Premier League.

Pakistan’s first football tournament began on May 28, 1948 as the National Football Championship, a knock-out competition, which remained as the top football competition in the country until 2004 with the introduction of the Pakistan Premier League. In 1979, a domestic cup was added to Pakistani football, known as the Pakistan National Football Challenge Cup.

The 1948–49 Pakistan National Football League was the first season of the NFL and ended with Sindh Blue being crowned champions. The National Football League era though saw Karachi based Pakistan Airlines with most championships, winning the competition nine times. The Pakistan Premier League era is different though as most of the champions of the league have come from Punjab side with Khan Research Laboratories from Rawalpindi winning the league five times.

Currently, the team with the most championships in Pakistan Premier League is  Khan Research Laboratories, who have won five championships in the league. However, Pakistan Airlines are the team with the most championships overall, winning National Football League nine times.

Champions
 Bold indicates double winners – i.e. League and Domestic (National Challenge) Cup.
 Italic indicates team winning the season unbeaten – i.e. (invincible).

National Football League (1948–2003)

Pakistan Premier League (2004-present)

Total titles won 
Teams in bold compete in the Premier League as of the 2018–19 season.

Note: † represents dissolved teams.

Total titles won by provinces 
Punjab has dominated the football league in Pakistan with a total of 31 league titles won between three cities; Faisalabad, Lahore and Rawalpindi. Sindh based Karachi and East Bengal based Dacca dominated the league from 1960 to 1965; Dacca winning consecutive titles from 1960-61 and 1961-62, and Karachi winning back to back three titles from 1962-63, 1963-64 and 1964-65.

By City / Town

Multiple trophy wins 
Only three clubs have won double in Pakistan football.

References

Pakistan
Champions